Rust Valley Restorers is a Canadian documentary series produced by Mayhem Entertainment for History in association with Corus Entertainment. Reruns of the series air on DTour (formerly Prime and TVTropolis).

In the United States seasons 1 & 2 are distributed by Netflix, while seasons 3 & 4 are distributed by Motor Trend On Demand (although are referred to as seasons 4 & 5, respectively). However, internationally the series is distributed by Netflix and shown as a Netflix original series.

Premise
The series takes place in the South Shuswap, an area in Tappen, British Columbia, also called as "Rust Valley", which is known for its unique car community and junkyards. It is shot at a vintage automobile restoration shop run by skilled craftsmen who restore, trade and sell classic cars into collectible vehicles.

Cast

Main 
 Michael (Mike) Hall, owner of Rust Bros Restorations. A rock blaster by profession, Hall began collecting cars in his teens and decades later owned over 400 parked on his property near the Trans-Canada Highway. He tried to sell both the cars and his property in 2016 but received no offers. When he raised the price in 2017, the story went viral and he received phone calls from prospective buyers. He also received offers from producers to create a documentary. Hall has also made a guest appearance on Discovery Canada TV show Highway Thru Hell. Hall then built a restoration workshop on his property and the show started in 2018.
 Avery Shoaf, a car-interested friend of Mike Hall's. Shoaf previously had a company which repaired heavy equipment.  Owner of Wildman Restorations
 Connor Charman-Hall, Mike Hall's son who used to work in Avery Shoaf's business.

Recurring 
 Sarah Ward joined Rust Bros in 2018 and primarily works with locating the correct parts for vehicles that are being restored.

Episodes

Series overview

Season 1 (2018–19)

Season 2 (2019–20)

Season 3 (2021)

Season 4 (2022)

Release
In December 2018, Rust Valley Restorers premiered on the History Canadian Channel, and on August 23, 2019 the series was released to Netflix. A second season was ordered and a trailer was released on October 22, 2019 with the season premiering on November 21, 2019. The second season was released to Netflix on May 8, 2020. The second season was split into two parts for the Netflix release with each part consisting of six episodes.

References

External links
 
 

2018 Canadian television series debuts
2010s Canadian documentary television series
2020s Canadian documentary television series
Automotive television series
English-language television shows
History (Canadian TV network) original programming